The 95th Infantry Division was a German division in World War II. It was formed on 19 September 1939  in Wildflecken and Hammelburg.

The division was destroyed in June 1944 near Vitebsk. On 10 September 1944, a newly formed 95th Division was placed under command of the defeated army group Mitte in East Prussia. In the winter of 1944 she fought at Tauroggen and the Memel, until she surrendered in April 1945 at Pillau and the Hel Peninsula.

Commanding officers
Generalleutnant Hans-Heinrich Sixt von Armin, 25 September 1939 – 10 May 1942
Generalleutnant Friedrich Zickwolff, 10 May 1942 – 6 September 1942
Generalleutnant Friedrich Karst, 6 September 1942 – 1 October 1942
Generalleutnant Eduard Aldrian, 1 October 1942 – 3 October 1942
General der Infanterie Edgar Röhricht, 3 October 1942 – September 1943
Generalmajor Gustav Gihr, September 1943 – 27 February 1944
Generalmajor Herbert Michaelis, 27 February 1944 – 28 June 1944 (POW)
Generalmajor Joachim-Friedrich Lang, 10 September 1944 -16 April 1945 (KIA)

War Crimes

The 95th division participated in the Massacre at Babi Yar

Second formation 
Generalmajor Joachim-Friedrich Lang, 10 September 1944 - 16 April 1945 (KIA)

References

External links

0*095
Military units and formations established in 1939
1939 establishments in Germany
Military units and formations disestablished in 1945